Mark Shanahan is an Irish conductor and conducting teacher.

Biography
Mark Shanahan was born in Manchester, where he attended Chetham's School. He later attended the University of London and studied conducting at the Royal Academy of Music with the Sir Henry Wood Scholarship. While still studying at the Royal Academy of Music he won the first prize of the first NAYO Conducting Competition.

Mark Shanahan is active as an opera and orchestral conductor, and he has been associated with the English National Opera. Mark Shanahan has conducted operas in theatres such as La Fenice, Théâtre Graslin, Nationale Reisopera, Opera North, Grange Park Opera, Opera Ireland, English Touring Opera, Marseilles Opera and the Frankfurt Opera.

Guest conducting engagements include concerts at halls such as the Royal Festival Hall, Barbican Centre and Royal Albert Hall with orchestras including the RTÉ National Symphony Orchestra, Royal Philharmonic Orchestra, Orchestra of Opera North, Stavanger Symphony Orchestra and the Orquesta Filarmónica de Gran Canaria. He is also Guest Conductor of the Netherlands Symphony Orchestra and Artistic director of the Forest Philharmonic Orchestra.

Shanahan is a Guest Professor of conducting at the Royal Academy of Music, guest conductor at the Guildhall School of Music and Drama and a Visiting conducting Fellow at the Royal Northern College of Music in Manchester.

References

External links 
 

Musicians from Manchester
Living people
English conductors (music)
British male conductors (music)
Alumni of the Royal Academy of Music
Academics of the Royal Academy of Music
21st-century British conductors (music)
21st-century British male musicians
Year of birth missing (living people)